Neopilina bruuni is a species of monoplacophoran, a superficially limpet-like marine mollusc. It is found in the southeastern Pacific Ocean, off the coast of South America.

References

Monoplacophora
Molluscs described in 1968